Cole-Hamilton is a British surname. It can refer to:

 Arthur Cole-Hamilton (1750–1810), Anglo-Irish politician
 Alex Cole-Hamilton (born 1977), Scottish politician
 Anni Cole-Hamilton, founder of Moray Firth School
 Air Vice Marshal John Cole-Hamilton (1894–1945), British military commander
 Josh Hamilton (actor) (born 1969), American actor, born Joshua Cole Hamilton